Dicuspiditermes hutsoni, is a species of small termite of the genus Dicuspiditermes. It is found from Palmadulla area of Sri Lanka.

References

Termites
Insects described in 1926